The Men's 100 metres B1 was a sprinting event in athletics at the 1988 Summer Paralympics in Seoul, for blind athletes. Seven athletes took part, representing six nations. They included defending champion Winford Haynes, of the United States. Haynes was unable to retain his title, outrun by Soviet athletes who were making their Paralympic Games début.

The International Paralympic Committee's database does not record any heats, merely a final round in which the seven athletes took part.

Results

References 

Men's 100 metres B1